The Death of God and the Meaning of Life is a book by Julian Young, in which the author examines the meaning of life in today's secular, post-religious scientific world.

See also 

 God is dead

References

External links 
 The Death of God and the Meaning of Life

2003 non-fiction books
Books about meaning of life
Death of God theology
Books about Friedrich Nietzsche
Books about Søren Kierkegaard
Books about Karl Marx
Continental philosophy literature